Love Hungry is a 1928 American comedy film directed by Victor Heerman and written by Randall Faye and Frances Agnew. The film stars Lois Moran, Lawrence Gray, Marjorie Beebe, Edythe Chapman, James Neill and John Patrick. The film was released on April 8, 1928, by Fox Film Corporation.

Cast
Lois Moran as Joan Robinson
Lawrence Gray as Tom Harver
Marjorie Beebe as Mamie Potts
Edythe Chapman as Ma Robinson
James Neill as Pa Robinson
John Patrick as Lonnie Van Hook

References

External links
 

1928 films
1920s English-language films
Silent American comedy films
1928 comedy films
Fox Film films
Films directed by Victor Heerman
American silent feature films
American black-and-white films
1920s American films